Jason Mercier (born November 12, 1986) is an American professional poker player from Hollywood, Florida. He has won five World Series of Poker bracelets and one European Poker Tour title. Mercier is a member of Team PokerStars Pro and was named the Bluff Magazine Player of the Year for 2009. He was WSOP player of the year in 2016.

Mercier has been ranked number one in the world by ESPN and the Global poker index. He holds the record for most weeks spent at number 1 on the GPI, 84.  As of January 2018, his live tournament winnings exceed $18,500,000. His 58 cashes at the WSOP account for over $4,500,000 of those winnings.

European Poker Tour 
In 2008 Mercier made two final tables at the European Poker Tour (EPT).  His first was at the EPT San Remo in season 4 where he won the event earning  €869,000 ($1,372,893) with a final table that included online professional poker players, and Team PokerStars Pro's Dario Minieri (3rd) and William Thorson (6th).  The following  season he made his second EPT final table coming in 6th in the 2008 EPT Barcelona event in season 5, earning €227,800 ($324,946). Sebastian Ruthenberg. won the tournament.

In October 2008, he won the EPT London £20,000 High Roller Event. Better known as the "2008 £1 Million Showdown", this non-title event earned Mercier an additional £516,000 ($944,847). The final table included runner-up John Juanda, who had recently won the 2008 World Series of Poker Europe Main Event.  Other notable contestants at the final table were online pros Mike "SirWatts" Watson and Isaac Haxton as well as professionals Scotty Nguyen, David Benyamine and Isabelle Mercier.

World Series of Poker 
Mercier has won five gold bracelets and made 17 final tables at the WSOP; On June 18, 2016, he became the 24th player to have won at least five bracelets. In addition to his tournament victories, Mercier has made the final table twice at the World Series of Poker Europe Main Event, finishing 4th in 2009 for £267,267 and 8th in 2012 for €84,672.

World Series of Poker Bracelets

North American Poker Tour 
Mercier won the 2010 NAPT Mohegan Sun $25,000 Bounty Shootout tournament earning a total of $475,000. He beat a final table which included Sam Stein, who finished runner-up in the NAPT Venetian Main Event, and Faraz Jaka, who finished 5th at the NAPT Venetian Bounty Shootout event. In 2011, he repeated as the NAPT Mohegan Sun Bounty Shootout champion, not only winning the event, but also collecting the most bounties for a total of $246,600.

World Championship of Online Poker 
On September 21, 2010, Mercier won his first WCOOP bracelet in Event 42, besting a field of 3,122 runners.

Spring Championship of Online Poker 
On May 15, 2014, Mercier won his first SCOOP title in Event 34-M. With three more titles in 2015 and one in 2016, Jason has a total of 5 SCOOP titles.

Notes

1986 births
American poker players
World Series of Poker bracelet winners
WSOP Player of the Year Award winners
European Poker Tour winners
People from Hollywood, Florida
Living people